Togo competed in the 2003 All-Africa Games held at the National Stadium in the city of Abuja in nearby Nigeria. The team entered twenty five events and came joint thirty first overall with three bronze medals. Medals were awarded in women's discus, men's open singles table tennis, and men's powerlifting.

Competition
Togo entered twenty five events at the games, eighteen for men and seven for women. The country was well represented in athletics, particularly in the women’s events. Alifatou Djibril competed in both discus and shot put, winning bronze in the former. Other athletes included Sandrine Thiebaud, who came third in the second heat for the 400 metres but failed to qualify for the final.

Medal summary
The country won a tally of three medals, all bronze. The country ranked joint thirty first in the medal table.

Medal table

List of Medalists

Bronze Medal

See also
Togo at the African Games

References

2003 in Togolese sport
2003
 Nations at the 2003 All-Africa Games